Colorina is a Peruvian telenovela produced by Michelle Alexander for América Televisión, based on the 1980 Mexican drama of the same name produced by Valentín Pimstein for Televisa. It stars Magdyel Ugaz and David Villanueva as the titular character.

The first season consists of 54 episodes, and from the second season on, the telenovela was renamed Colorina: Madre por siempre.

Plot 
Colorina (Fernanda) works in a nightclub as a prostitute with her great friend Lupita (Muñeca Montiel). Both arrive at the mansion of Luis Carlos invited by Ivan, a sponger who is brother-in-law of Luis Carlos Villamore. Colorina and Luis Carlos had met before and fall in love, but their relation is not well seen by the cold and calculating mother of Luis Carlos, Matilde. Diana, the wife of Luis Carlos, is terminally ill and can not have children. Luis Carlos and Colorina start an affair and accidentally she becomes pregnant with a son. Luis Carlos wants to help Colorina and she moves to his family house. Matilde tries to still the baby from Fernanda but she manages to run away with the help of Lupita and her lover Homero.  At the same time, Bertha, the maid in service of the Villamore house leaves her husband Pancho and her two children, who are actually Ivan's. With the consent of Pancho, Colorina decides to take the two children to confuse the mother of Luis Carlos and escapes to Piura.

Episodes 
<onlyinclude>

Cast 
 Magdyel Ugaz as Colorina
 David Villanueva as Luis Carlos
 Claudio Calmet as Panchito
 Malory Vargas es Orfelinda
 Christian Domínguez es Aquiles
 Nicolás Fantinato as Ramiro
 Bruno Odar as Rogelio
 Jimena Lindo como Esterlina
 Stephanie Orué  as Berta
 Juan Carlos Rey de Castro as Iván
 Gonzalo Molina como Homero
 Carlos Casella como Gérard
 Natalia Torres  como Matilde

Reception 
The telenovela has received several negative and positive criticism from the Peruvian audience. According to Kantar Ibope the telenovela debuted with a total of 21.3 million viewers, becoming the most watched in their schedule.

Music 
Track listing

References 

2017 telenovelas
Peruvian telenovelas
Spanish-language telenovelas
América Televisión telenovelas
2017 Peruvian television series debuts
2018 Peruvian television series endings